Mazurkas, Op. 17 is a set of four mazurkas for piano by Frédéric Chopin, composed and published between 1832 and 1833. A typical performance of the set lasts about fourteen minutes.

Composition

Frédéric Chopin composed his Op. 17 in 1832-33 and they were published in Leipzig in 1834. During the time that Chopin was composing the mazurkas, he had recently settled in France, as he had become a refugee from Poland, however, he hoped he could move back to Poland when the political system had changed. This hope was never realized.

Even though Chopin had moved away from his homeland, he never forgot his Polish roots, especially in his Mazurkas.

Structure

No. 1

thumb| F. Chopin. Mazurka Op. 17 No.1, performed by Christoph Zbinden (musopen).

Description

The first Mazurka in the set is in B-flat major and has a time signature of 3/4. It also has the tempo marking: Vivo e risoluto (Tempo:♩=160).

Musical analysis

The piece starts with a short, bold theme and is soon followed by a section in question and answer. This phrase is then completed with a descending sequence. This main theme then repeats in two different new keys, one after the other. The Mazurka then finishes with a slower section and the main theme repeated once more. There is then a D.C. al fine and the whole piece then starts again and finishes at the start of the final, slower section with a B-flat chord in octaves.

No. 2

Description

The second mazurka is in E minor, is in 3/4, and has a tempo marking of Lento, ma non troppo. A typical performance of the E minor Eleventh lasts about two-and-a-half minutes.

Musical analysis

The Mazurka features an almost waltz style to it. The piece is in a very homophonic texture with a single tune accompanied by chords. The piece ends with intricate arpeggio patterns and a very quiet ending, contrasting with the forte beginning.

No. 3

Description

The third mazurka, in A-flat major, is marked Legato assai. This piece is one of the longest mazurkas Chopin wrote, lasting about six minutes in a typical performance.

Musical analysis

The third Mazurka of this set is comparable to the previous in its texture: very homophonic. The piece unfolds with very varied dynamics and half-way through, it changes to the key of E major but changes back to the original key for the last few bars and the coda.

It doesn’t follow traditional harmonic progressions (giving it a peculiar sound). There are no subdominant (IV) or submediant (VI) chords in the entire movement. Most of the movement is composed of dominants (and their dominants), tonics, iii or III, and vii° chords. This particular movement is in compound ternary form. As many composers did in the romantic period, Chopin contrasts tonic by moving to the flat submediant (bVI).

No. 4

Description

The last mazurka in the set is in 3/4 and is marked Lento, ma non troppo. This piece lasts about four or five minutes in a typical performance. It is one of the more popular mazurkas of all Chopins' mazurkas.

Musical analysis

The final Mazurka of the set is more characteristic and free than the others. Although it remains in the very homophonic texture, the dynamic variation is much greater. The piece ends with the same four measures as it began, with no pedal, the chords played by the left hand portamento, the tone and time fading away in a perdendosi. These four measures would later be sampled by Henryk Górecki in the opening of the third movement of his third symphony.

This mazurka was used by modern composer John Williams in the 1987 Steven Spielberg motion picture, “Empire Of The Sun” as a recurring leitmotif within the piece, “Toy Planes, Home and Hearth”.

References

External links
 Mazurka Op. 17 No.1, No.2, No.3 and No.4 played by Arthur Rubinstein (YouTube)
 Mazurka Op. 17 No.4 played by Vladimir Horowitz (YouTube)
 

1833 compositions
Mazurkas by Frédéric Chopin
Music with dedications